Ivan Ljubičić won the title, defeating Stefan Koubek 6–3, 6–4 in the final.

Seeds

  Ivan Ljubičić (champion)
  David Ferrer (first round)
  Richard Gasquet (second round)
  Radek Štěpánek (second round)
  Mario Ančić (second round)
  Jarkko Nieminen (second round)
  Igor Andreev (first round)
  Feliciano López (second round)

Draw

Finals

Top half

Bottom half

External links
 2006 PBZ Zagreb Indoors draw
 2006 PBZ Zagreb Indoors Qualifying draw

Singles